Genis may refer to:
 Génis, a commune in France
 the writer Daniel Genis
 the writer Alexander Genis
 the Italian word for alto horn
 the Genis Sage, a character in the video game Tales of Symphonia